The Emigrant Church at Sletta is a chapel of the Church of Norway in Alver Municipality in Vestland county, Norway. It is located in the village of Sletta, but it originally stood in Brampton Township in the state of North Dakota in the United States. It is an annex chapel in the Radøy parish which is part of the Nordhordland prosti (deanery) in the Diocese of Bjørgvin.

The white, wooden church was built in the early 1900s in the rural township of Brampton in the US state of North Dakota. The small Lutheran Church existed for many decades until it closed. In 1997, a group of Norwegian-Americans in North Dakota gave the church to a group of Norwegians who wanted to move it to Norway. It now stands on the island of Radøy as part of the Western Norway Emigration Center. The church was consecrated in 1997 by the Bishop Ole Danbolt Hagesæther, and it was given the name .

Media gallery

See also
List of churches in Bjørgvin

References

External links

Alver (municipality)
Churches in Vestland
Long churches in Norway
Wooden churches in Norway
20th-century Church of Norway church buildings
Churches completed in 1921
Churches completed in 1997
1997 establishments in Norway